Army Group B was the title of three German Army Groups that saw action during World War II.

Operational history
Army Group B first took part in the Battle of France in 1940 in Belgium and the Netherlands. It was commanded by Generaloberst Fedor von Bock and included the 6th and 18th armies under Walter von Reichenau and Georg von Küchler.

The second formation of Army Group B was established when Army Group South was divided for the summer offensive of 1942 on the Eastern Front. Army Group B was given the task of protecting the northern flank of Army Group A, and included the 6th Army during the Battle of Stalingrad. In February 1943, Army Group B and Army Group Don were combined to create a new Army Group South.

A new Army Group B was formed in northern Italy under Field Marshal Erwin Rommel in July 1943. Its task was to secure Northern Italy after the overthrow of Mussolini and to disarm the Italian Army there as part of Operation Achse. 

After the stabilisation of the front on the Winter Line south of Rome by Kesselring's Army Group C, and the creation of the Salo Republic in Northern Italy, Army Group B was moved to Northern France on 26 November 1943. Army Group B participated in the Battle of Normandy. On 19 July 1944, Field Marshal Günther von Kluge took command from the injured Rommel. During the Allied offensive in August when the Falaise Pocket threatened to completely encircle Army Group B Kluge was replaced by Field Marshal Walter Model on 17 August. Kluge was recalled to Berlin and on 19 August committed suicide out of fear he was implicated in the July 20 plot against Hitler. Army Group B escaped across the Seine but lost around 60,000 troops and much of its equipment.

Moving to the Low Countries, Model with his HQ located at Oosterbeek close to Arnhem, was surprised on 17 September by the start of Operation Market Garden. The army group also participated in the Battle of the Bulge. The army group was isolated in the Ruhr Pocket in northern Germany, and after being divided up into smaller and smaller sections, the final section surrendered to the Allies on 21 April 1945. Model committed suicide the same day rather than be tried by the Soviets for war crimes committed on the Eastern Front.

Commanders
Western Front

Eastern Front

Northern Italy/Northern France

Chiefs of Staff
 12 October 1939 – 9 May 1941 General Hans von Salmuth
 20 May 1941 General Hans von Greiffenberg
Eastern Front
 August 1942 – 20 May 1943 General Georg von Sodenstern

Order of battle

Notes

References

Bibliography
 

B
Military units and formations established in 1939
Military units and formations disestablished in 1943